Penig is a town in the district of Mittelsachsen, in the Free State of Saxony, Germany. It is situated on the river Zwickauer Mulde, 19 km northwest of Chemnitz. The old and the new castle were owned by the House of Schönburg from 1378 until 1945. Penig housed a concentration camp during World War II.

People
Friedrich Eduard Bilz

References 

Mittelsachsen